Armavir Radar Station is an early warning radar station near Armavir in Krasnodar Krai, Russia. It is a key part of the Russian early warning system against missile attack and is run by the Russian Aerospace Defence Forces. There are two radars here - one faces south west and one south east. They provide radar coverage of the Middle East.

The station was described as starting to operate at the end of 2006  and then entering "experimental combat mode" in 2008. On the day in 2009 that Russia lost coverage from radars in Ukraine it was announced that it had "begun operations". In May 2012 it was announced that it would go on combat duty before the end of 2012. In December 2012 it was announced it will be in the first quarter of 2013. 6 June 2013 commissioned by order of the President Vladimir Putin visiting the Central Command Post of the Russian Armed Forces. Planned second segment, which will overlap zone of the Gabala radar station.

It was developed by NIIDAR (НИИДАР) and was built by Spetsstroy (Федеральное агентство специального строительства, also called Спецстрой России). Equipment installation was performed by Spetstehmontazh (Спецтехмонтаж).

Voronezh radar

Voronezh radar are highly prefabricated radars needing fewer personnel and using less energy than previous generations.

One of the radars, facing southwest, replaces the coverage lost  by the dispute with Ukraine over the Dnepr radars in Mukachevo and Sevastopol. The other, facing south east, can replace the Daryal radar in Gabala although it is behind in construction.

Armavir and Gabala
Data from Armavir, together with Gabala was offered to the United States as part of the negotiations over Russian opposition to US missile defence in Europe. Armavir is close to Iran, like Gabala, and also provides intelligence on missile activity in the Middle East.

Armavir cannot completely counter the loss of Gabala. Gabala is further south and has a longer range. Armavir may also be affected by the Caucasus Mountains.

In 2007 Vladimir Popovkin, then commander of the Russian Space Forces, said that Gabala, together with Balkhash in Kazakhstan and the two stations in Ukraine, cannot be relied upon as Russia cannot be sure it will have access to them in periods of international tension and war.

2013 ballistic launch in Mediterranean
On 3 September 2013 Armavir detected two US/Israeli ballistic test launches in the Mediterranean towards Syria.

References

External links
 Voronezh-DM Armavir photos from Novosti Kosmonavtiki

Russian Space Forces
Russian and Soviet military radars
Military installations of Russia